Sergio Cortés Godoy (born 11 January 1968) is a former professional tennis player from Chile.

Career
Cortés was a leading junior player in South American, winning the continental championships in the 14s, 16s and 18s age groups.

He was a quarter-finalist in the 1989 Geneva Open.

Cortés competed in just one Grand Slam event, the 1993 US Open, where he reached the third round. He defeated American Derrick Rostagno and Dutchman Jacco Eltingh, both in four sets and was then eliminated in straight sets by Boris Becker.

In 1993 he had one of the best wins of his career beat when he beat world number 31 Magnus Larsson at the Lipton Championships in Florida

Cortés made the quarter-finals of a Bogota ATP tournament, along the way defeating Andrei Chesnokov, then the world number 40.

He appeared in six ties for the Chile Davis Cup team, with a record of 5-5 in singles and 2-0 in doubles.

Challenger titles

Singles: (3)

Doubles: (1)

References

1968 births
Living people
Chilean male tennis players
People from Antofagasta
Pan American Games medalists in tennis
Pan American Games bronze medalists for Chile
Tennis players at the 1995 Pan American Games
South American Games medalists in tennis
South American Games silver medalists for Chile
Competitors at the 1986 South American Games
20th-century Chilean people